Francis Low may refer to:
 Francis E. Low (1921-2007), American theoretical physicist
 Francis S. Low, United States Navy admiral